Schoeneck (German: Schöneck) is an unincorporated community and census-designated place (CDP) in West Cocalico Township, Lancaster County, Pennsylvania, United States. Schoeneck is a corruption of the Pennsylvania Dutch phrase Schoenes Eck, which translates to "pretty corner".  As of the 2010 census the population was 1,056.

Geography
Schoeneck is in northeastern Lancaster County, in the southern part of West Cocalico Township. Interstate 76, the Pennsylvania Turnpike, passes through the northern part of the community, with the closest access  to the east near Reamstown.

The community is drained by tributaries of Indian Run, which flows south to Cocalico Creek in Ephrata and is part of the Conestoga River watershed running eventually to the Susquehanna.

Education
Schoeneck is part of the Cocalico School District. A long-time presence in Schoeneck, the Schoeneck Elementary School closed in June 2011. Schoeneck students are now transported to the Denver Elementary School.

Community services
Schoeneck is home to the Schoeneck Volunteer Fire Company.

References

External links
Schoeneck Elementary School (archived)
Schoeneck Fire Company

Populated places in Lancaster County, Pennsylvania
Census-designated places in Lancaster County, Pennsylvania